Cristian Nicolás Ivanobski (born 11 February 1990) is an Argentine footballer who plays for the American club Los Angeles Force.

References

External links
 Profile at BDFA 
 
 MacedonianFootball

1990 births
Living people
Argentine footballers
Argentine expatriate footballers
Association football forwards
Club Atlético Tigre footballers
Santiago Morning footballers
A.C. Barnechea footballers
C.D. Antofagasta footballers
Cimarrones de Sonora players
Atlético Zacatepec footballers
Cobreloa footballers
Puerto Montt footballers
Los Angeles Force players
Primera B de Chile players
Argentine Primera División players
Chilean Primera División players
National Independent Soccer Association players
Expatriate footballers in Chile
Expatriate footballers in Mexico
Expatriate soccer players in the United States
Argentine expatriate sportspeople in Chile
Argentine expatriate sportspeople in Mexico
Argentine expatriate sportspeople in the United States